Cerro Tenerife may refer to:

 Cerro Tenerife (Chile), a mountain
 Cerro Tenerife (Venezuela), a hill